Juanes is a Colombian musician, member of the rock band Ekhymosis and now a solo artist.

Juanes may also refer to:

People
Juanes de Ávila or Juanes Dávila (1514–????), Licentiate in law and civil servant of the Spanish Empire who was governor and captain general of Cuba between 1544 and 1546
Ángel Juanes Peces (born 1947), Spanish judge who served as President of the Audiencia Nacional (2009-2014) and as first Vice President of the Spanish Supreme Court (2014-2019) 

Places
Santos Juanes, Valencia, a Roman Catholic church located in the Mercat neighborhood of the city of Valencia, Spain

See also
Los cuatro Juanes, 1966 Mexican drama film directed by Miguel Zacarías
Juan, a given name, the Spanish language and Manx language versions of John